Mulla is a 2008 Malayalam film directed, by Lal Jose starring Dileep, Meera Nandan, Biju Menon and Saiju Kurup.

Plot
Lachi is a hard-working 19-year-old who supports her family after her father's mysterious death. While she was traveling on a train, Mulla and his gang enter. They argue over silly issues, and he discovers a baby in a bag on the train. They try to find the baby's parents but fail. Mulla decides to adopt the child, and slowly Mulla and Lachi become lovers.

CI Bharathan, who murdered Lachi's father and the baby's parents, wants to break up the two to keep his secrets. He kills Mulla's friend Ambi who helped Bharathan to kill Lachi's father as he thought that Ambi will reveal the truth to Lachi. Finally, Mulla and Bharathan get into a fight, and Mulla kills Bharathan. However, Lachi tells the police that she committed the murder and goes to prison. After five years, when she returns, she finds that Mulla has lost one leg in a fight between the colony residents and the police. The colony residents had started a new business, and they all are having a good life now. The only thing they had lacked is Lachi's presence. Lachi and Mulla finally unite.

Cast

Dileep as Mulla 
Meera Nandan as Lachi 
Biju Menon as Ambi
Saiju Kurup as CI Bharathan
Suraj Venjaramood as Bijumon
Shruthy Menon as Malli
Bhavana as a lunatic woman (cameo appearance)
Salim Kumar as 'Thotti' Sasi 
Guinness Pakru as Chandran
Chali Pala  
Rizabawa as Venu 
Sukumari as Akka 
Shivaji Guruvayoor as Bhadran
Vanitha Krishnachandran as Lachi's mother 
Sudheer Karamana  
 Joju George
Mala Aravindan   
Reena Basheer as Malathi 
Anoop Chandran as Idiyappam
Bala Singh
Ashok in a special appearance in the song "Katteda"
Suja Varunee in a special appearance in the song "Katteda"
Japan Kumar in a special appearance in the song "Katteda"

Soundtrack

References 

 http://www.thehindu.com/todays-paper/tp-national/tp-kerala/cast-camera-prop-up-mulla-film-review/article1231758.ece
 http://www.rediff.com/movies/2008/mar/28ssm.htm - Rediff Review
 https://web.archive.org/web/20090623013747/http://popcorn.oneindia.in/title/532/mulla.html

External links
 

2000s Malayalam-language films
2008 romantic drama films
2008 films
Films scored by Vidyasagar
Films directed by Lal Jose
Indian romantic drama films
Films shot in Palakkad